Maqsudabad (also Romanized as Maqşūdābād) is a village in Kuhpayeh Rural District, Nowbaran District, Saveh County, Markazi Province, Iran. At the 2006 census, its population was 249, in 92 families.

People in this village speak Turkish.

References 

Populated places in Saveh County